Jaroslav Babušiak (born 6 September 1984 in Kraľovany) is an alpine skier from Slovakia.  He competed for Slovakia at the 2010 Winter Olympics.  Jaroslav also competed for Slovakia at the 2006 Winter Olympics, where he achieved his best result, a 24th place finish in the slalom.

References

External links
 
 

1984 births
Living people
Slovak male alpine skiers
Olympic alpine skiers of Slovakia
Alpine skiers at the 2006 Winter Olympics
Alpine skiers at the 2010 Winter Olympics
Universiade medalists in alpine skiing
Universiade silver medalists for Slovakia
Universiade bronze medalists for Slovakia
Competitors at the 2009 Winter Universiade